The Quad at Whittier is a shopping mall in Whittier, California.

It was built in 1953 and expanded in 1965 with the addition of a May Company California department store. Arcadia-based Hinshaw's and Pasadena-based Nash's were other major tenants.

After the center was destroyed by the 1987 Whittier Narrows earthquake, its owners began renovating it as a strip mall. Hinshaw's, the only store not affected by the earthquake, closed in 1992.

The current shopping center includes Burlington Coat Factory (which opened in 1999 in the old Hinshaw's), Michael's, Old Navy, Rubi's, Ross Dress for Less, Staples, Rite Aid (formerly Thrifty Drugs), Vallarta Supermarkets (formerly Ralphs), Olive Garden, Chili's, and TJ Maxx.

References

Shopping malls in Southeast Los Angeles County, California
Whittier, California
Shopping malls established in 1953
1953 establishments in California